Vendula is a female given name. The name is of Czech origin and originated as a nickname for Václava, the feminine form of name Václav.

Notable bearers
Vendula Dušková, Paralympic swimmer
Vendula Frintová, triathlete
Vendula Hopjáková, snowboarder
Vendula Kotenová, luger
Vendula Přibylová, ice hockey player
Vendula Strnadová, footballer

External links
Vendula on Behind The Name

Feminine given names
Czech feminine given names